Maria Cláudia Motta Raia (born 23 December 1966) is a Brazilian actress, singer, dancer, and stage producer.

Biography
Raia was born in Campinas and was married to Edson Celulari from 1993 until 2010. They had two children: Enzo Celulari and Sophia Raia. Today is committed to her boyfriend, the artist Jarbas Homem de Mello and had her third child at 56 years old, called Luca.
Her first Rede Globo telenovela was Roque Santeiro, created by Dias Gomes. Ever since, she has starred in many other Globo telenovelas.

Television roles

Television 
 1985 - Roque Santeiro as Ninon/Maria do Carmo
 1987 - O Outro as Edwiges
 1987 - Sassaricando as Tancinha (Constância Gutiérrez de Pádua)
 1987/92 - TV Pirata as Tonhão and Penelope
 1990 - Rainha da Sucata as Adriana Figueroa "Adriana Ross"
 1991 - Vamp as  Celeste
 1992 - Deus nos Acuda as  Maria Escandalosa (Maria Rodrigues Garcia)
 1993/99 - Você Decide
 1995 - Engraçadinha... Seus Amores e Seus Pecados as Engraçadinha
 1995 - A Próxima Vítima as Última Vítima
 1995 - A Comédia da Vida Privada as Paola
 1996 - Não Fuja da Raia
 1998 - Torre de Babel as Ângela Vidal
 1999 - Sai de Baixo as Petúnia Baaleiro
 1999 - Mulher
 1999 - Terra Nostra as Hortência
 2000 - Brava Gente as Karla
 2001/03 - Os Normais as Michelle and Marcela Magrela
 2001 - As Filhas da Mãe as Ramona / Ramón Cavalcante
 2002 - O Beijo do Vampiro as Mina de Montmartre
 2003 - Sítio do Picapau Amarelo as Medéia
 2005 - Mad Maria as Tereza
 2005 - Belíssima as Safira Solomos Güney
 2006 - Minha Nada Mole Vida as Brenda Karla
 2007 - Sete Pecados as Ágatha Trindade 
 2008 - A Favorita as Donatela Fontini
 2010 - A Grande Família as Vânia Lira (special participation)
 2010 - Ti Ti Ti as Jaqueline Maldonado
 2012 - Salve Jorge as Lívia Marini
 2014 - Alto Astral as Samantha Santana "Samantha, the Paranormal"
 2016 - Haja Coração as Herself (special participation)
 2016 - A Lei do Amor as Salete Meloni 
 2019 - Verão 90 as Lidiane "Lidi Pantera"

Awards and nominations

APCA Awards

Art Quality Brazil Awards

Best of the Year – Globe Awards

Bibi Ferreira Awards

Contigo! Awards

Extra Television Awards

Press Trophy

Quem Awards

References

External links 

 

1966 births
Living people
People from Campinas
Brazilian telenovela actresses
Brazilian film actresses
Brazilian Buddhists
Actresses from São Paulo (state)
Converts to Sōka Gakkai 
Members of Sōka Gakkai
Nichiren Buddhists